Taimara Suero Coronado (born December 21, 1979 in Havana) is a women's basketball player from Cuba. Playing as a forward, she won the gold medal with the Cuba women's national basketball team at the 2003 Pan American Games in Santo Domingo, Dominican Republic. Suero also competed for her native country at the 2000 Summer Olympics in Sydney, Australia.

References
FIBA Profile
 sports-reference

1979 births
Living people
Cuban women's basketball players
Basketball players at the 2000 Summer Olympics
Olympic basketball players of Cuba
People from Havana
Basketball players at the 2003 Pan American Games
Basketball players at the 2007 Pan American Games
Pan American Games gold medalists for Cuba
Pan American Games bronze medalists for Cuba
Pan American Games medalists in basketball
Central American and Caribbean Games gold medalists for Cuba
Competitors at the 2006 Central American and Caribbean Games
Forwards (basketball)
Central American and Caribbean Games medalists in basketball
Medalists at the 2003 Pan American Games
Medalists at the 2007 Pan American Games